La Raya de Santa María is a corregimiento in Santiago District, Veraguas Province, Panama with a population of 3,268 as of 2010. Its population as of 1990 was 3,401; its population as of 2000 was 3,517.

References

Corregimientos of Veraguas Province